Bhim Public High School is located in Bhimeshwor, Dolakha District, Nepal. It is one of the oldest high schools in the district, established in 2007. While most students are local, others from surrounding areas also attend due to the lack of another high school nearby.

The school was built partly with government funding and partly by the efforts of local volunteers.

Secondary schools in Nepal
Educational institutions established in 2007
2007 establishments in Nepal
Buildings and structures in Dolakha District